Death is a Caress is a 1949 Norwegian film noir starring Claus Wiese, Bjørg Riiser-Larsen and Ingolf Rogde. Based on a 1948 novel by Arve Moen, it was Edith Carlmar's directorial début, and the first Norwegian film directed by a woman.

The film depicts the passionate and tempestuous liaison between mechanic Erik (Wiese) and society woman Sonja (Riiser-Larsen). The film uses cinematic shorthand to convey time and place, while concentrating on its protagonists' increasingly troubled relationship.

References

External links
 
 

1949 films
1949 drama films
Film noir
Films directed by Edith Carlmar
Norwegian drama films
1940s Norwegian-language films
Norwegian black-and-white films